Terry Thripp (born 31 October 1963) is a former Australian rules footballer who played for Sydney in the Victorian/Australian Football League (VFL/AFL).

The first Sydney local to play with the Swans after they relocated, Thripp was recruited from Pennant Hills after playing his junior football for Baulkham Hills. 

Thripp represented New South Wales at the 1988 Adelaide Bicentennial Carnival. Thripp had his best season in 1989 when he bagged 22 goals and had 291 kicks over the course of the season. A utility, he also gathered eight Brownlow Medal votes, equal second most by a Sydney player that year, behind Greg Williams.

Thripp also played a number of games at North Shore and is the centre half back in their official 'Team of the Century'. His father, Bill, was a footballer at Collingwood.

References

1963 births
Living people
East Coast Eagles players
Sydney Swans players
North Shore Australian Football Club players
Pennant Hills Australian Football Club players
New South Wales Australian rules football State of Origin players
Australian rules footballers from New South Wales